Abbé J. A. Dubois or Jean-Antoine Dubois (January 1765 – 17 February 1848) was a French Catholic missionary in India, and member of the Missions Etrangères de Paris; he was called Dodda Swami by the local people. In his work on Hindu manners, customs and traditions he presented Indian cultures, traditions, thoughts and the varnasrama system. He returned to France, and authored a book of Indology, Hindu Manners, Customs and Ceremonies. 

Dubois is remembered in India for having adopted the way of life, clothing, vegetarianism and language typical of a Hindu monk or renunciate, and earning trust and respect. He failed, however, in his mission of converting Indians to Christianity; and often expressed the opinion that the project was doomed to failure.

Early life
Dubois was baptized on 10 January 1766 at Saint-Remèze, in Ardèche, now in south-central France. He was ordained in the diocese of Viviers in 1792, and sent for India that same year, as an MEP missionary.

Career

In India
In India, Dubois was at first attached to the Pondicherry mission, and worked in the southern districts of the present Madras Presidency. After the fall of Srirangapatna in 1799, he went to Mysore to reorganize the Christian community.

He abjured European society, adopted the native style of clothing, and made himself in habit and costume as much like a Hindu as he could. He used to go around in the garb of sanyasi and abstained from eating meat for many years.

He was credited with the founding of agricultural colonies and the introduction of vaccination as a preventive of smallpox. He also caused a church to be built in Srirangapatna, known in his honour as the "Abbe Dubois Chapel."

He was known as Dodda Swami-avaru in the Mysore region.

Rev. Elijah Hoole of the Wesleyan Mission records meeting Abbe Dubois on Saturday 4 August 1821 at Seringapatam. He describes the Abbe as being dressed in Muslim or Turkish clothes. The Abbe complains about many of his followers being forced to convert to Islam by Tipu Sultan. Having gained proficiency in local languages and customs, the Abbe gained respect among the locals. In his conversation with Elijah, the Abbe expressed the view that India was incapable of accepting Christianity and advised Elijah to return to England at the earliest.

Later career
Dubois left India in January 1823, with a special pension conferred on him by the East India Company. On reaching Paris, he was appointed director of the Missions Étrangères de Paris, of which he afterwards became superior (1836-1839). He translated into French the famous book of Hindu fables called Panchatantra, and also a work called The Exploits of the Guru Paramartha.

Writings on Indology

Hindu Manners, Customs and Ceremonies 
His most notable work was Hindu manners, customs and ceremonies. Although Dubois disclaimed the title of author, his collections were not so much drawn from the Hindu sacred books as from his own careful and vivid observations, and it is this, united to a remarkable prescience, that makes his work so valuable. The book contains three parts:

 a general view of society in India, and especially of the caste system
 the four states of Brahminical life
 religious practices — festivals, feasts, temples, objects of worship

Lord William Bentinck purchased Dubois's French manuscript for eight thousand rupees for the British East India Company in 1807. In 1816 an English translation was published, and about 1864, a curtailed reprint of this edition was issued. The Abbé, however, largely recast his work as Mœurs, institutions et cérémonies des peuples de l'Inde (published in Paris in 1825), and in 1897 this revised text (now in the India Office) was published in an edition with notes by H. K. Beauchamp.

Sylvie Murr has claimed that Dubois' Hindu Manners, Customs and Ceremonies derived from Gaston-Laurent Cœurdoux's original manuscript, Mœurs et coutumes des Indiens, now lost.

Other writings
Of much interest was his Letters on the State of Christianity in India, published in London in 1823, in which he asserted his opinion that under existing circumstances, there was no possibility of "overcoming the invincible barrier of Brahminical prejudice" so as to convert the Hindus to any sect of Christianity. He acknowledged that low castes and outcastes might convert in large numbers, but of the higher castes, he wrote:

"Should the intercourse between individuals of both nations, by becoming more intimate and more friendly, produce a change in the religion and usages of the country, it will not be to turn Christians that they will forsake their own religion, but rather ... to become mere atheists."

Abbe Dubois Chapel, Srirangapatna

Citations

References

Primary
Description of the Character, Manners and Customs of the People of India, and of their Institutions, religious and civil. London: Longman, Hurst, Rees, Orme and Brown, 1816. Derived, as Sylvie Murr shows, from G.-L. Cœurdoux's original manuscript, Mœurs et coutumes des Indiens, now lost. See De Smet, Review of the two volumes of Murr, Indian Theological Studies 27 (1990) 371–373.
Letters on the state of Christianity in India, in Which The Conversion On The Hindoos Is Considered As Impracticable. To which is added a vindication of the Hindus, male and female, in answer to a severe attack made upon both by the Reverend ****. London: Longman, Hurst, Rees, Orme, Brown and Green, 1823. Reprinted by Asian Educational Services [?].
Hough, James. A Reply to the Letters of the Abbé Dubois on the State of Christianity in India. London: L.B. Seeley & Son, 1824.
Townley, H. An Answer to the Abbé Dubois in which the various wrong principles, misrepresentations and contradictions, contained in his work, entitled "Letters on the State of Christianity in India" are pointed out; and the Evangelization of India is, both on sound principle and on solid fact, demonstrated to be practicable. London, 1824. 
[Refutation of the letters of Abbe Dubois]. The Friend of India (Calcutta) (1825). 
Mœurs, institutions, et cérémonies des peuples de l'Inde. Enlarged edition of the 1816 work. Paris, 1825, 2 vols.
Exposé de quelques-uns des principaux articles de la théogonie des Brahmes. Paris, 1825. 
[Reply to criticisms.] Bulletin des Sciences (May 1825).
Le Pantcha-tantra ou les cinq ruses, fables du Brahme Vichnou-Sarma. Paris, 1826.
The Exploits of the Guru Paramarta.
[Reply to criticisms.] Asiatic Journal vol. 1 (1841).
Hindu Manners, Customs and Ceremonies. Oxford: Clarendon Press, 1899.
Hindu Manners, Customs and Ceremonies: The Classic First-Hand Account of India in the Early Nineteenth Century. Ed. Henry K. Beauchamp. Courier Dover, 2002.

Secondary
Mœurs et coutumes des Indiens (1777). Un inédit du Père G.-L. Cœurdoux, SJ, dans la version de N.-J. Desvaulx. Vol. 1. Éd. Sylvie Murr. Paris: École Française d'Extrême-Orient, 1987. Pp. 247.
L'Indologie du Père Cœurdoux. Vol. 2. Ed. Sylvie Murr. Paris: Ecole Française d'Extrême-Orient, 1987. Pp. 250. 
De Smet, Richard. Review of Sylvie Murr, Vol. 1: Mœurs et coutumes des Indiens (1777): Un inédit du Père G.-L. Cœurdoux, S.J. dans la version de N.-J. Desvaulx. Vol. II: L’Indologie du Père Cœurdoux (Paris: École Française d’Extrême-Orient, 1987). Indian Theological Studies 27 (1990) 371–373.
.

1765 births
1848 deaths
French Roman Catholic missionaries
Roman Catholic missionaries in India
People from Ardèche
French expatriates in India